{{DISPLAYTITLE:Iota2 Scorpii}}

ι2 Scorpii, Latinised as Iota2 Scorpii, is a single star in tail of the zodiac constellation of Scorpius. It has an apparent visual magnitude of +4.82, and is visible to the naked eye. Because of parallax measurement errors, the distance to this star is only approximately known: it lies around 2,500 light years away from the Sun. It has a visual companion, a magnitude 11.0 star at an angular separation of 31.60 arcseconds along a position angle of 36°, as of 2000.

In the literature, there are two different stellar classifications for this star: A2 Ib and A6 Ib. In either case it is an A-type supergiant star with an estimated age of 30 million years and a mass 8.8 times that of the Sun. It shines with a luminosity 5,798 times the Sun's from an outer atmosphere that has an effective temperature of 6,372 K. As with other stars of its type, ι2 Scorpii varies slightly in brightness, showing an amplitude of 0.05 in magnitude.

References

External links

Scorpii, Iota2
Scorpius (constellation)
A-type supergiants
087294
6631
161912
Durchmusterung objects